Eleanor Morton was Miss Australia in 1980.

Early years

Morton was born on 26 January 1958 in Campbelltown, South Australia. She was the middle of three children, Ann (sister) and Craig (brother). Her parents, Joseph and Margaret, were both immigrants from Ireland and Scotland, respectively. Eleanor attended Campbelltown High, graduating at 16 years old. She then went on to study and complete a Bachelor of Education at the University of South Australia.

Career & Miss Australia Quest
Eleanor enjoyed various lines of work prior to the Miss Australia quest, including roles at the Canadian Consulate, Ansett Australia and ANZ. At age 20, Eleanor won the title of Miss South Australia and went on to compete in the Miss Australia Quest in the same year. For her successful charity work with the Cerebral Palsy Alliance, Eleanor was awarded the title of 1980's Miss Australia. The following year saw Eleanor tour both Australia and America, spreading the word of the Cerebral Palsy Alliance and participating in other charity avenues, involving children. During her reigning year, Eleanor had the opportunity to meet Charles, Prince of Wales, Prince Albert ll of Belgium, Begum Khan, and even actor Mark Hamill.
Eleanor attended the National Museum of Australia's exhibition in 2007, "Miss Australia: A Nation's Quest", with her youngest daughter. She donated her titled sashes to be displayed amongst other quest memorabilia.

Personal life
Shortly after the quest, Eleanor moved to Sydney, New South Wales.  She now lives in the Upper North Shore of Sydney.
In 1987, Eleanor married sports commentator Michael Duff in Adelaide. In 1991, Eleanor and Michael had their first child, Alexandra. In 1995, they had a second daughter, Lucinda.

Family
Ann (sister),
Craig (brother),
Margaret (mother),
Joseph (father, deceased),
Alexandra (daughter),
Lucinda (daughter)

References

http://www.nma.gov.au/exhibitions/miss_australia_a_nations_quest/miss_australia_national_titleholders
https://www.cerebralpalsy.org.au/wp-content/uploads/2013/07/Miss-Australia-Booklet-Web.pdf

Australian beauty pageant winners
1958 births
Living people